The Aleramici were a northern Italian noble and royal dynasty of Frankish origin which ruled various northwestern Italian territories in Piedmont and Liguria from the 10th to the 14th century, also reigning over the Kingdom of Jerusalem and the Kingdom of Thessalonica during the 12th and 13th centuries. Their name derived from count Aleramo, proclaimed first Marquis of Central Liguria by emperor Otto the Great in 966. The Aleramici were divided in two main lines: the Marquises of Savona or del Vasto, and the Marquises of Monferrato. In the 14th century the line of Monferrato ended in Irene of Montferrat, Empress of Constantinople, whilst the line of Savona carried on in multiple descending branches.

History
The oldest known member of the lineage was the Frankish count Willehmus, a Burgundian who is thought to have gone to the Carolingian Kingdom of Italy around 888 or 889, possibly to aid Guy III of Spoleto in his quest for the Iron Crown of Lombardy. His son Aleramo, received from King Hugh of Italy the first feudal domains in Central Liguria in the year 933, later confirmed by Holy Roman Emperor Otto the Great, who in addition granted him and his descendants the hereditary title of Marchio or Margrave of the Holy Roman Empire.

The Aleramici formed one of the four imperial margraviates in the northern Kingdom of Italy, soon becoming one of the most powerful dynasties of the Middle Ages. Due to their ancestral Salic tradition, they divided their original territory into multiple marquisates, grouped into two main lines founded by Aleramo's two surviving sons: the Marquises of Savona, or del Vasto, descendants of the eldest son Anselmo, and the Marquises of Monferrato, descendants of the youngest son Otto. Despite their constant territorial division between the multiple male descendants, the Aleramici managed to mantain control over an important part of the Piedmont and the Eastern flank of the Ligurian Bay, forming powerful alliances throughout the ruling houses of Europe, including the Capetians and the Hohenstaufens. 

The cadet line of Monferrato gained notable influence and power through their involvement in the Crusades, becoming kings and queens of Jerusalem, first by marriage and then by succession in the 12th century. Recognized as a royal lineage, the Aleramici of both lines married into numerous of royal dynasties, most notably the three Byzantine Imperial dynasties of Comnenus, Angelus and Palaeologus, with whom they formed their most important alliance.  As a result of the Fourth Crusade, the Aleramici founded the Latin Kingdom of Thessalonica, then replaced by the Empire of Thessalonica. During this period, two women of the Monferrato line held the title of "Empress Consort" ot the Eastern Roman Empire (Empress Agnes and Empress Irene). By the 14th century the Marquisate of Monferrato passed to Theodore I Paleologus, son of Empress Irene, last of the Aleramici of Monferrato.

Despite the extinction of their cadet branch, the Aleramici survived the Middle Ages through the multiple descending branches of the Marquises of Savona, including the Marquises of Saluzzo (from 1135 to 1548), Finale (ruled by the Aleramici del Carreto from 1135 to 1602), Ceva, Busca, Clavesana, Loreto, Bosco, Belforte, Ussecio, Pareto, Varazze, Ponzone, amongst others, who's domains were mostly absorbed by the Republic of Genoa between the 12th and 14th centuries. Only the Marquises of Finale and the Marquises of Saluzzo continued to rule over part of the original Aleramician domains until the 16th century.

Gallery

Family tree

See also
March of Montferrat
Marquisate of Saluzzo
Marquisate of Finale
Marquisate of Ceva

Notes

External links

 
Monferrato
March of Montferrat